The Europe of Nations Group was a Eurosceptic political group with seats in the European Parliament between 1994 and 1996.

History
The Europe of Nations Group (Coordination Group) was formed on 19 July 1994. It was the first Eurosceptic Group in the Parliament. It lasted until 10 November 1996. The group was succeeded by the Independents for a Europe of Nations from 20 December 1996.

MEPs
MEPs in Europe of Nations Group (Coordination Group) on 1 August 1994 were as follows:

See also
Democracy in the European Parliament
Europe Politique
France Politique
Archive of European Integration
European Parliament

References

External links
Official site: 

Former European Parliament party groups
Euroscepticism